Donny Hathaway is the second studio album by American soul artist Donny Hathaway, released on April 2, 1971, on Atco.

The majority of songs featured on the collection were covers of pop, gospel and soul songs that were released around the same time. The most prominent of the covers were Hathaway's rendition of Leon Russell's "A Song for You" and a gospel-inflected cover of Gladys Knight & the Pips' "Giving Up", written by Van McCoy. This was the second of three solo studio albums that Hathaway released during his lifetime before his suicide in 1979. Atlantic producer Jerry Wexler took over most of the production duties, with Hathaway producing one track, the self-penned "Take a Love Song".

Track listing
"Giving Up" (Van McCoy) (6:20)
"A Song for You" (Leon Russell) (5:25)
"Little Girl" (Billy Preston) (4:47)
"He Ain't Heavy, He's My Brother" (Bob Russell, Bobby Scott) (5:55)
"Magnificent Sanctuary Band" (Dorsey Burnette) (4:24)
"She Is My Lady" (George S. Clinton) (5:33)
"I Believe in Music" (Mac Davis) (3:38)
"Take a Love Song" (Hathaway, Nadine McKinnor) (4:53)
"Put Your Hand in the Hand" (Gene MacLellan) (3:49)

Bonus tracks on CD 
"Be There" (Donny Hathaway, Charles Ostiguy) (3:02)
"This Christmas" (Hathaway, Nadine McKinnor) (3:51)

Personnel
Donny Hathaway – lead vocals, keyboards (all tracks)
Myrna Summers – background vocals (tracks 1-7, 9)
Sammy Turner – background vocals (tracks 1-7, 9)
King Curtis – tenor saxophone solo (track 1)
Joe Newman – trumpet solo (track 6)
Chuck Rainey – all bass guitars (tracks 1-7, 9)
Phil Upchurch – electric bass guitar (8)
J.R. Bailey – background vocals (tracks 1-7, 9)
John Littlejohn – guitar, vocals
Cissy Houston – background vocals (tracks 1-7, 9)
Judy Clay – background vocals (tracks 1-7, 9)
Cornell Dupree – guitar (tracks 1-7, 9)
Interdenominational singers – background vocals (tracks 1-7, 9)
Jack Jennings – percussion
Morris Jennings – drums (track 8)
Steve Novosel – additional bass guitar (track 8)
Sylvia Shemwell – background vocals (tracks 1-7, 9)
Myrna Smith – background vocals (tracks 1-7, 9)
Ivory Stone – background vocals (track 8)
Deirdre Tuck Corley – background vocals (tracks 1-7, 9)
Lillian Tynes – background vocals (track 8)
Ronnie Bright – background vocals (tracks 1-7, 9)
Al Jackson Jr. – drums (tracks 1-7, 9)
Arif Mardin, Donny Hathaway – string, horn and choral arrangements
Technical
Howard Albert, Murray Allen, Ron Albert, Gene Paul, Jimmy Douglass – engineer
Loring Eutemey – cover
Michael Woodlon – cover photography

References

1971 albums
Donny Hathaway albums
Albums produced by Donny Hathaway
Albums produced by Arif Mardin
Albums produced by Jerry Wexler
Atco Records albums